Lake Plastiras also called Tavropos Reservoir is an artificial lake fed by  Tavropos (Megdovas) river, located in Karditsa regional unit, near the city of Karditsa, Greece. The lake is named after the Greek general and politician Nikolaos Plastiras, who was the first to visualize the construction of an artificial lake in the area.

Initial plans
The idea of building a reservoir in the area was allegedly first conceived by general Nikolaos Plastiras who, in 1925, was visiting his hometown in the area. During this time the whole area was devastated by a major flood of the river Tavropos. He put pressure to the Minister of Agriculture, who put together a team to study the case by 1929. The following years till the Second World War the idea was met with opposition by politicians.

Creating the reservoir
After the war, the idea was revived by Plastiras as he was proclaimed Prime Minister. The (then newly formed) Power Corporation adopted the project as part of their effort to electrify the country. An international contest was held in 1953 that was won by the French Omniun Lyonnais. The building of the dam started on December 14, 1955. On October 30, 1960, the dam was officially inaugurated, although the flooding may have started as early as the last months of 1959.

The lake today

Today the lake holds up to 400 million cubic meters of fresh water. It is used for irrigation and as a power source of a hydroelectric plant, but also as the main water source to the city of Karditsa. Due to its altitude (one of the highest in Europe) the Tavropos Reservoir is a popular tourist resort in Greece, as  the formed landscape is quite unique.

See also
Plastiras Dam

Bibliography
 Paul Hellander, Greece. Lonely Planet 2008

References

External links

Lake Plastiras

Plastiras
Landforms of Karditsa (regional unit)
Landforms of Thessaly
Natura 2000 in Greece